Sepedon spinipes is a species of fly (insects in the family Sciomyzidae). It is found in the  Palearctic

References

External links
Images representing Sepedon at BOLD

Sciomyzidae
Insects described in 1763
Muscomorph flies of Europe
Taxa named by Giovanni Antonio Scopoli